El Sitio is a town located within the municipality of Pinos in the state of Zacatecas.

Populated places in Zacatecas